Konrad Hippenmeier (5 June 1880 – 10 April 1940) was a Swiss architect. His work was part of the architecture event in the art competition at the 1912 Summer Olympics.

References

1880 births
1940 deaths
19th-century Swiss architects
20th-century Swiss architects
Olympic competitors in art competitions
Place of birth missing